Pierre Slidja (born 18 February 1996) is a French footballer who currently plays for AC Amiens as a forward. He has previously represented Valenciennes, Amiens and Chamois Niortais. Slidja is of Algerian descent.

References

External links

 

1996 births
Living people
Sportspeople from Amiens
French footballers
French sportspeople of Algerian descent
Association football forwards
Amiens SC players
Valenciennes FC players
Chamois Niortais F.C. players
ASM Belfort players
Wasquehal Football players
AC Amiens players
Ligue 2 players
Championnat National players
Championnat National 2 players
Championnat National 3 players
Association football midfielders
Footballers from Hauts-de-France